Liam Connor was a character in Coronation Street.

Liam Connor may also refer to:
Liam Connor Jr., Coronation Street character
Liam Connor (Gaelic footballer)

See also
Liam O'Connor (disambiguation)